= After the Spring =

2018 comic book by Hélène Aldeguer

After the Spring: A Story of Tunisian Youth (French: Après le printemps : Une jeunesse tunisienne) is a graphic novel by Hélène Aldeguer about the aftermath of the Tunisian Revolution as experienced by four young people. It was originally published in French by Futuropolis in 2018. The English version, released in 2019, was translated by Edward Gauvin and published by IDW Comics/Penguin Random House.

The events of the graphic novel occurred in 2013.
